Benicàssim (or , according to numismatic findings) is a municipality and beach resort located in the province of Castelló, on the Costa del Azahar in Spain. The Desert de les Palmes mountain range further inland shelters the town from the north wind. The name is derived from the Banu Qasim tribe, a segment of the Kutama Berbers that settled the area during the 8th century Moorish conquest of Spain.

Benicassim is located 13 km north of the town of Castelló de la Plana, at the north end of the Valencian Community. The town has a population of 18,991 (2021). Its economy is largely based on tourism; the town is well known for its beaches and its music festivals such as Festival Internacional de Benicàssim (FIB) and the Rototom Sunsplash.

Beaches 
Benicassim has 6 kilometers of sandy beaches linked by a promenade. The five beaches in this stretch of coast are named 
 Voramar  This beach is famous for its villas along a beach front promenade, walking from the Hotel Voramar there are beautiful traditional villas with an amazing history of the highlife of the arts and theatrical society of the 1920’s.   
 Heliòpolis
Torreón
 Almadraba
 Els Terrers

The beaches have been awarded the Blue Flag quality certification since 1987.

Desert of the Palms

Just inland from Benicàssim lies the Desert of the Palms (Valencian: Desert de les Palmes; Spanish: Desierto de las Palmas). The area is not a literal desert, but a protected natural area and a small mountain range with a maximum elevation of 729 meters (at the peak of Mount Bartolo). The Columbretes Islands are visible from the top of the range on clear days.

Festivals 

Festival Internacional de Benicàssim FIB
Rototom Sunsplash

 MABE Benicàssim Art Show.

Vía Verde
The ”Vía Verde” (green way) is a 5.5 km long cycle and walking path along the rugged coast between the resort towns of Benicassim and Oropesa del Mar.

Notes

External links
 Benicàssim town council
 Benicassim Costa Azahar
 Benicassim Description
 Muestra de Arte de Benicàssim MABE
 Benicassim culture

Municipalities in the Province of Castellón
Plana Alta